The Torre de la Malmuerta is a gate tower of the Axerquía wall in Córdoba, Spain.

This albarrana tower was built in 1406–1408,  by order of King Henry III of Castile, over a pre-existing Almohad structure, to defend the gates of Rincón and Colodro.  Later it was also used as a prison for nobles.

Having an octagonal plan, the tower has an annexed arch. 

The names, meaning "Tower of the Wrongly Dead Woman", refers to a woman who, according to a legend, was killed here by her husband after a false accusation of adultery.

External links

Buildings and structures completed in 1408
Towers completed in the 15th century
Buildings and structures in Córdoba, Spain
Malmuerta